Click, Klick and Klik may refer to:

Airlines
 Click Airways, a UAE airline
 Clickair, a Spanish airline
 MexicanaClick, a Mexican airline

Art,  entertainment,  and media

Fictional characters
 Klick (fictional species), an alien race in the game Alternity
 Click, a minor character in The Rock-afire Explosion Music Stage Show

Film
 Click (2006 film), an American comedy starring Adam Sandler
 Click (2010 film), a Hindi horror film

Music
 The Click (album), a 2017 album by pop band AJR
 Click track

Artists
 The Click, an American hip hop group

Songs
 "Click" (ClariS song)
"Click" (Charli XCX song)
 "The Click" (song), a song by Good Charlotte
 "Click", a song by Anahí, Ale Sergi and Jay de la Cueva
 "Click", a song by Little Boots from Hands

Print
 Click (comics)
 Click (novel)
 Click!, a newspaper
 Click, a science magazine for children by the publishers of Spider
 "Click", a short story by R. L. Stine in the book Tales to Give You Goosebumps
 Click, a now-defunct general interest magazine published by Triangle Publications

Radio
 Click (radio programme)
 KLIK, a radio station
 Click of Click and Clack, hosts of Car Talk

Television
 Click (Canadian TV series), an instructional series
 Click (game show)
 Click (Philippine TV series), a teen drama
 Click (TV programme), a news programme about technology
 "Click", a season 3 Goosebumps episode
 "Click", an erotic softcore TV series
 "Klick" (Better Call Saul), the season 2 finale of Better Call Saul

Computing
 Klik (packaging method), a Linux packaging software
 Apache Click, a web application framework
 Clik!, a disk drive
 Klik, a series of game creation systems designed by Clickteam
 Point and click, a gesture made with a computer input device such as a mouse
 ClickSoftware, a software company now owned by Salesforce

Other uses
 Click, Llano County, Texas, United States
 Shannan Click, American model
 Klik (candy), an Israeli candy
 Click chemistry, a chemical philosophy
 Click consonant, a speech sound
 Click track, used in audio recording
 Click (acoustics), a sonic artifact
 Heart click, a cardiac symptom
 Hyundai Click, a car
 Click (brand), a house brand of Bunnings Warehouse
 Click! Network, a cable TV and Internet provider in Washington State, United States 
 KLIK! Amsterdam Animation Festival, a festival for short animation films held annually in Amsterdam
 Klick Health, a company co-founded by Leerom Segal
 Snap (fingers), the act of creating a cracking sound with one's fingers
 A component of a ratchet
 A subsidiary retail chain of Acme Fresh Market
 Klick, U.S. military slang for a kilometer
 Klick Photoshop, a brand of Timpson (retailer), UK
 Click Asia Summit, a congress

See also
 Clique (disambiguation)